Club Deportivo Topiltzín  are a Salvadoran professional football club based at Jiquilisco, Usulután in El Salvador.

History 
In 1978, Topiltzin was founded. In 2013, Toplitzin won their first title in the tercero division winning 2–1 over Huracan in the 2013 Apertura. 

On the 14th of January, 2018 due to failed payment to player, the club would not be registered and caused the club to be de-registered from the Segunda Division FESFUT confirma descenso de cuatro equipos de segunda a tercera división.

Honours

Domestic honours
 Segunda División Salvadorean and predecessors 
 Champions (1) : TBD
 Tercera División Salvadorean and predecessors 
 Champions:(1) : Apertura 2013

Current squad
As of October 2021:

Players

Internationals who have played at Topiltzin
 Carlos Ayala
 Erber Burgos
 José Manuel Martinez
 Pompilio Cacho

Personnel

Management

List of coaches

References

Football clubs in El Salvador
Association football clubs established in 1978
1978 establishments in El Salvador